Cephisodorus or Kephisodoros was a male Greek name.

1. Cephisodorus, an Athenian dramatist of the Old Comedy.  According to Lysias, he was a comic poet who won a victory in 402 BC. This victory was probably in the Lenaea; around the same time Cephisodorus appears on the surviving victory lists for the City Dionysia.  The Suda says that he was a tragedian, and credits him with four plays: Antilais, Amazons, Trophonius, and The Hog.  The titles quoted by the Suda are comic, and so the identification of Cephisodorus as a tragedian is likely to be an error.

2. Cephisodorus, a military commander who died at the battle of Mantineia at 362 BC.

3. Kephisodoros, an Athenian leader who opposed Philip V during the Second Makedonian War. After allying Athens to fellow Greek powers including Attalos I of Pergamon, Ptolemy V of Egypt, the Aitolian League, Krete, and Rhodes, he travelled to Rome to request the Senate for further aid against Makedon. The Romans sent Publius Sulpicius Galba Maximus, Publius Villius Tappulus (who Pausanias calls Otilios), and Titus Quinctius Flamininus who defeated Philip V at the Battle of Kynoskephalai.

References

Ancient Greek dramatists and playwrights
Greek poets
Old Comic poets
Ancient Greek poets
Greek male poets